Disney Sing-Along Songs is a series of videos on VHS, betamax, laserdisc, and DVD with musical moments from various Disney films, TV shows, and attractions. Lyrics for the songs are sometimes displayed on-screen with the Mickey Mouse icon as a "bouncing ball". Early releases open with a theme song introduction (written by Patrick DeRemer) containing footage featuring Professor Owl and his class, seen originally in 1953 in two Disney shorts, Melody and Toot, Whistle, Plunk, and Boom (voiced then by Bill Thompson). Professor Owl (now voiced by Corey Burton) hosts some of the videos, while either Jiminy Cricket or Ludwig Von Drake host others. Later volumes, as well as the two Christmas videos, do not feature a host at all. Scenes with Jiminy Cricket and Ludwig Von Drake were taken from television programs, including the Walt Disney anthology television series and The Mickey Mouse Club, which featured the characters in the 1950s and 1960s.

History
The first of four distinct series was issued beginning on December 23, 1986, with Zip-a-Dee-Doo-Dah, which would be followed by five more volumes. The second series released in August 1990 with Under the Sea and Disneyland Fun, featuring a new design and reissued volumes labeled One (1) through Twelve (12) in North America (worldwide, volume numbers). The third series, which began with 1994's Circle of Life, saw another new package design and the re-release of all previous volumes (excluding Fun with Music, repackaged as 101 Notes of Fun along with Hercules for markets outside North America). Around 1996 this series incorporated Mickey's Fun Songs repackaged as Sing-Along Songs (a three volume live-action set in the style of Disneyland Fun). Spanish-language editions of some volumes were released (Disney Canta Con Nosotros). Some songs moved to newer volumes, newly remixed opening and closing songs appeared. The final release in this format was Flik's Musical Adventure at Disney's Animal Kingdom on June 8, 1999. In the remixed opening and closing themes, the remixed opening can be heard on Friend Like Me, Circle of Life, Honor to Us All, and Collection of All-Time Favorites, and the remixed closing can be heard on the 1993 and 1994 editions of Heigh-Ho, as well as Friend Like Me, Circle of Life, and Collection of All-Time Favorites. This series abandoned any new volume numbers, included only sporadically on third series volumes. A special three volume set, Collection of All-Time Favorites, was released in 1997. There have been over 30 titles released to home video. Newly remastered editions began appearing in 2002 on Disney DVD, beginning with Very Merry Christmas Songs, featuring a new package design, bonus features, and some new songs. Some Disney DVD feature releases include individual songs as bonus features. Winnie-the-Pooh Sing a Song volumes are being incorporated into the Sing Along Songs series. The DVD series (fourth series) features Sebastian the Crab (from The Little Mermaid) singing the theme song, replacing Professor Owl.

Following the advent of YouTube's online video-sharing platform, Disney has chosen to release individual sing-along videos on their channel, thus discontinuing the video series.

Volumes: Original series (1986–1998)

Zip-a-Dee-Doo-Dah (1986)

Volume notes
 Hosted by Professor Owl
 Originally issued to promote the November 21, 1986, theatrical re-release of Song of the South, celebrating the film's 40th Anniversary, and representing the launch of the new home video series of (as yet, unnumbered) Sing Along Songs.
 Footage for the song "It's a Small World" was taken from Disneyland Goes to the World's Fair, which aired May 17, 1964. On the song itself, the pitch appears to be shifted one semitone higher on the recording after  the snake charmer-style music.
 Ending footage to "Zip-a-Dee-Doo-Dah Reprise" was taken from This is Your Life, Donald Duck, where the Disney gang comes to pay tribute to Mickey, Donald and Goofy.
 1986 original print and 2001 print featured Sorcerer Mickey with "presents" appearing below it.
 For some reason, the 2001 print starts with the same promo featured at the end of the 1990 print, then goes on to Sorcerer Mickey and then the 1994 print's intro.
 Known as Cancion del Sur: Zip-a-Dee-Doo-Dah in Spanish, released in Spain.
 Known as Cendrillon: Bibbidi-Bobbidi-Boo in French, released in France and the United States.

Heigh-Ho (1987)

Volume notes
 Hosted by Professor Owl
 Released in 1987 to promote the theatrical re-release of Snow White and the Seven Dwarfs on the film's 50th Anniversary
 Though designated in 1990 as Volume One (just as Snow White is "Animated Feature #1"), Sing Along Songs: Heigh Ho was the second release, preceded by Sing Along Songs: Zip-a-Dee-Doo-Dah (1986). But Volume Four in the UK.
 There is extensive use of footage from Adventures in Music: Melody and Toot, Whistle, Plunk, and Boom throughout the entire program, with a new script synched to the old video
 The 1993 edition features a preview for all eleven numbered volumes to date
 Footage of Pirates of the Caribbean in the song Yo Ho was taken from Disneyland: From the Pirates of the Caribbean to the World of Tomorrow, which aired January 21, 1968
 †"The Siamese Cat Song" was cut from the 1994 print, but returns in Honor to Us All and is retained on the Spanish version.
 †"Yo-Ho" was cut from the 1993 print, but is retained on the Spanish version.
 The 1993 edition includes the remixed closing theme, which was also heard on Friend Like Me, Circle of Life, From Hercules and Collection of All Time Favorites.
 The 3rd series edition (1994) incorporates the new themes introduced on Friend Like Me, Circle of Life, Collection of All Time Favorites, and Honor to Us All
 Known as Blanca Nieves: Heigh-Ho in Spanish, released in Spain, Latin America, and the United States.
 Known as Blanche-Neige: He Ho in French, released in France and the United States.

The Bare Necessities (1987)

Volume notes
 Hosted by Jiminy Cricket
 Released in 1987 to mark the 20th Anniversary of The Jungle Book.
 Known as El Libro de la Selva: Ritmo en la Selva in Spanish, released in Spain, and only a limited number of copies were released in the United States.
 Known as Le Livre de la Jungle: Il En Faut Peu Pour Être Heureux in French, released in France.

You Can Fly! (1988)

Volume notes
 Hosted by Ludwig Von Drake
 Released in 1988 to mark the 35th Anniversary of Peter Pan.
 †"He's a Tramp" was cut from the 1993 English print, but was retained in the Spanish version.
 Known as Peter Pan: Volorás, Volorás in Spanish, released in Spain, Latin America, and the United States.
 Known as Peter Pan: Tu T'Envoles in French, released in France and the United States.

Very Merry Christmas Songs (1988)

Volume notes
 † Songs featured only on the 2002 DVD release
 The first three prints of the program opened with the song "From All of Us to All of You", sung by Jiminy Cricket, with Mickey Mouse playing the piano. It was cut from the 2002 print, replaced by a voice-over and a Christmas setting instead of transition cards.
 During the end credits shown on the VHS release, a wide shot still frame background of the Christmas tree from the beginning of Lady and the Tramp is shown.
 Known as Feliz Navidad in Spanish, released in Spain.

Fun with Music (1989)

Volume notes
 Co-hosted by Professor Owl and Ludwig Von Drake.  At the beginning of the program, Professor Owl hosts.  When "All in the Golden Afternoon" ends, Ludwig Von Drake takes over as host. Finally, after "Blue Danube Waltz" is over, Professor Owl takes over as host for the rest of the program.
 The song "Let's All Sing Like the Birdies Sing" includes a montage with Disney birds from Bambi and the Silly Symphonies cartoon Birds in the Spring.
 "Old MacDonald Had a Band" originally appeared in the Disney short Jack and Old Mac, and was incorrectly credited to Toot, Whistle, Plunk, and Boom.
 This installment was the first to promote, and feature songs from, a then recently released Disney film (in this case, Oliver & Company). Prior to this, most installments promoted anniversary re-releases of older films.
 Retitled 101 Notes of Fun in the UK and other countries, and was not released until 1994.
 † "Cruella de Vil" appears in 101 Notes of Fun and replaces "Let's All Sing Like the Birdies Sing". It also replaces the reprise of "Why Should I Worry?".
 The end credits mistakenly credit Eva Gabor, as she didn't sing any of the songs in The Aristocats (Robie Lester did), and also forgets to credit Roscoe Lee Browne (voice of Francis in Oliver & Company), as he sang in the final scene as well.
 Known as 101 Dalmatas: Notas Musicales in Spanish, released in Spain. Also known as 101 Dalmatas: 101 Notas Musicales.
 Known as Les 101 Dalmatiens: 101 Notes de Musique in French, released in France.

Under the Sea (1990)

Volume notes
 Hosted by Ludwig Von Drake
 The first Disney Sing-Along Songs videocassette to feature familiar tunes not from Disney movies, set to clips from Disney movies and cartoons (merely marked as "Disney scenes").
 The first volume to credit the Quantel Paintbox in the end credits. Mike Bonner was credited as "Paintbox artist" for both this volume and "I Love to Laugh".
 The original 1990 release included a Disneyland 35th anniversary graphic at the beginning of the video.
 Known as La Sirenita: Bajo el Mar in Spanish, released in Spain, Latin America, and the United States.
 Known as La Petite Sirène: Sous L'Ocean in French, released in France and the United States.

Disneyland Fun (1990)
A full day of Disneyland is shown over Disney hit songs.

Let's Go to Disneyland Paris! (1993)
Similar plot to the US Disneyland version, but it takes place at the Paris, France Disneyland location.

Volume notes
 Roger Rabbit from Who Framed Roger Rabbit stars alongside the main Disney characters.
 After an introductory sequence, the sing-along commences with footage of the rides and attractions of Disneyland, with the appropriate characters' voice actors (and actress) dubbing lines of their costumed character counterparts.
 The 1994 re-print introduced a new opening graphic for the series, but retained the original closing graphic.
 Released in 1990 to mark the 35th Anniversary of Disneyland.
 This was the first Disney theme-park Sing-Along video.
 According to the quotes of this video shown on IMDb, David Buntley plays the "vacationer".
 "Zip-a-Dee-Doo-Dah" includes a rap verse not present in the original version.
 Let's Go to Disneyland Paris! was released in 1993.
 More modern characters such as Ariel, Beast, Belle, Aladdin, Jasmine, Jafar, Iago, Genie, Launchpad McQuack, Grammi Gummi, Sunni Gummi, and Tummi Gummi appear in Let's Go to Disneyland Paris!
 Peter Pan replaces Donald Duck in the song "Following the Leader" in Let's Go to Disneyland Paris!
 Jafar and Iago replace Captain Hook in the song "Grim Grinning Ghosts" in Let's Go to Disneyland Paris!
 More dialogue is used in Let's Go to Disneyland Paris! than in Disneyland Fun.
 Splash Mountain does not appear in Let's Go to Disneyland Paris!
 Known as Vamos a Disneyland Paris in Spanish, released in Spain. There is no Spanish version for Disneyland Fun.
 Known as En Route Pour Euro Disneyland in French, released in France. There is no French version for Disneyland Fun.

I Love to Laugh! (1990)

Volume notes
 Hosted by Ludwig Von Drake
 Retitled Supercalifragilisticexpialidocious in 1994, featuring new graphics at the start and new end credits
 The 1994 print featured the gold WDHV logo (with blue background), replacing the 1986 Sorcerer Mickey WDHV logo, which was a video editing error, but was bothered not to be corrected.
 Known as Mary Poppins: Supercalifagilistico in Spanish, released in Spain and Latin America.
 Known as Mary Poppins: C'est Bon de Rire in French, released in France and the United States.

Be Our Guest (1992)

Volume notes
 Hosted by Jiminy Cricket
 † "Little Wooden Head" was cut from the 1993 and 1994 versions while not being present in the Spanish version, but returns in Colors of the Wind.
 Known as La Bella y el Bestia: Nuestro Huésped in Spanish, released in Spain, Latin America, and the United States. Known as Qué Festin in Spain.
 Known as La Belle et la Bête: C'est la Fête in French, released in France and the United States.

Friend Like Me (1993)

Volume notes
 Hosted by Jiminy Cricket
 This to have a different intro to the theme song play over the opening graphics. In its place, we hear the last couple of bars of Friend Like Me, with the title Friend Like Me appearing in Disney's Aladdin-style font, framed by blue and purple smoke, continuing into the remixed opening theme. The remixed opening was heard on Circle of Life, Honor to Us All, Collection of All-Time Favorites, and the UK versions of Colors of the Wind and The Hunchback of Notre Dame in Spanish, while the remixed closing theme was also heard on the 1993 and 1994 editions of Heigh-Ho, as well as Circle of Life, Collection of All-Time Favorites, and Honor to Us All.
 Known as Aladdin: Un Amigo Fiel in Spanish, released in Spain, Latin America, and the United States. Also known as Un Amigo Genial.
 Known as Aladdin: Je Suis Ton Meilleur Ami in French, released in France and the United States.
 Instead of Professor Owl introducing Jiminy Cricket, Jiminy Cricket just shows up at the very beginning of the program.
 This is the first time that Professor Owl did not introduce the host.

The Twelve Days of Christmas (1993)
The gang spends Christmas at Mickey's Log Cabin and at Disneyland.

Volume notes
 No host (voiceover only)
 The song "Here Comes Santa" features highlights of the Disneyland Christmas Fantasy Parade

Campout at Walt Disney World (1994)
The gang spends time in the great outdoors at Fort Wilderness at Walt Disney World.

Volume notes
 † "Let's Go" is only present in the original version.
 Originally released as Mickey's Fun Songs - Campout at Walt Disney World, later reissued in the Sing Along Songs series
 Christian Buenaventura, Tiffany Burton, Michelle Montoya and Shira Roth from Kidsongs make appearances in the video.

Let's Go to the Circus! (1994)
Mickey and the gang visit Ringling Bros. and Barnum & Bailey Circus.

Volume notes
 † "Let's Go" is only present in the original version.
 Originally released as Mickey's Fun Songs - Let's Go to the Circus!, later reissued in the Sing-Along Songs series.
 Barry Manilow is reported to have composed the score for the video and wrote two original songs with Bruce Sussman, but credited as written by Andy Belling and Nick Allen.
 This is the only Disney live-action video that doesn't take place at Walt Disney World, even though the Disney characters are shown.
 Christian Buenaventura, Tiffany Burton and Michelle Montoya from Kidsongs, along with child actor Tahj Mowry, make appearances in the video.
 David Larible and Eric Michael Gillett make guest appearances on the video.

Circle of Life (1994)

Volume notes
 Hosted by Jiminy Cricket (1st edition only. 2003 edition featured voiceover only)
 † "Following the Leader" is only in the UK version and replaces "Everybody Wants to Be a Cat".
 ^ Songs in the 2003 DVD release
 2003 DVD release includes a Vocabulary Game and Guess That Song.
 Known as El Rey Leon: El Ciclo Sin Fin in Spanish, released in Spain. Also known as El Ciclo de la Vida.
 Known as Le Roi Lion: Le Cycle de la Vie in French, released in France and the United States.

Beach Party at Walt Disney World (1995)
Mickey and the gang have a big beach party.

Volume notes
 † "Let's Go" is only present in the original version.
 Originally released as Mickey's Fun Songs - Beach Party at Walt Disney World, later reissued in the Sing Along Songs series.
 Mario "Boo" Bailey and Tiffany Burton from Kidsongs make appearances in the video.

Colors of the Wind (1995)

Volume notes
 Hosted by Ludwig Von Drake
 Features the return of "Little Wooden Head", cut from the 1993 edition of Be Our Guest
 Known as Colours of the Wind in the UK, because of spelling differences in UK English and US English.
 VHS edition features updated preview for the 3rd series, plus a preview for the Mickey's Fun Songs three tape series
 † Songs in foreign versions and replace "Cinderella Work Song" and "Why Should I Worry?".
 †^ "Let's All Sing Like the Birdies Sing" only appears in foreign English versions (e.g. UK, Australia, etc.) and is replaced by "Hakuna Matata" in other countries.
 The "Can You Feel the Love Tonight" sing along has a new montage of Disney Lovers.
 The UK version of Colours of the Wind has new lettering and a Mickey bouncing ball with a feather band around its head (applies to releases in other countries).
 The Colors of the Wind laserdisc also included Mickey's Fun Songs: Let's Go to the Circus.
 Known as Pocahontas: Colores en el Viento in Spanish, released in Spain.
 Known as Pocahontas: L'Air du Vent in French, released in France.

Topsy Turvy (1996)

Volume notes
 Retitled as The Hunchback of Notre Dame in the UK and other countries.
 Segments only (no host)
 † Songs featured in The Hunchback of Notre Dame which replaced "Stand by Me", "The Dwarfs' Yodel Song (The Silly Song)", "Family", and "The Unbirthday Song".
 Known as El Jorobado de Notre Dame in Spanish, released in Spain.
 Known as Le Bossu de Notre Dame: Charivari in French, released in France.
 The lyrics "It's the day the devil in us gets released. It's the day we mock the pig and shock the priest" were changed to "Good is bad and best is worst and west is east. On the day, we think the most of those with least" to excise religious references. Esmeralda's pole-dancing scene was also cut to discourage sinful thoughts and sensations.
 The beginning of the song "Out There" is cut due to general misery.

Pongo and Perdita (1996)
Pongo, Perdita, and the puppies prepare for the Bow Wow Ball.

Volume notes
 The "Following the Leader" segment actually used a recording of the version in Disneyland Fun.
 The only volume without sing-along words on the screen, though it is Closed Captioned (CC) for the hearing impaired (as are most volumes), and sing-along lyrics have been added to the 2006 DVD release (though still incomplete)

From Hercules (1997)

Volume Notes
 Released in all parts of the world except the US
 Segments only (no host)
 In the song "Pecos Bill", Pecos Bill is shown having a cigarette in his mouth, which is censored in Home on the Range: Little Patch of Heaven due to references of tobacco use.
 The verse about the Painted Indians in "You Can Fly!" is cut in this volume, but appears in Home on the Range: Little Patch of Heaven.
 Known as Hércules in Spanish, released in Spain.
 Known as Hercule: Héros de Tous les Héros in French, released in France.

Collection of All Time Favorites series (1997)

Collection of All Time Favorites: The Early Years (1997)

Volume notes
 Hosted by Professor Owl (voiceover only, before all songs)
 Features songs from 1933–1949

Collection of All Time Favorites: The Magic Years (1997)

Volume notes
 Hosted by Professor Owl (voiceover only, before all songs)
 Features songs from 1950–1973

Collection of All-Time Favorites: The Modern Classics (1997)

Volume notes
 Hosted by Professor Owl (voiceover only, before all songs)
 Features songs from 1989–1997

Honor to Us All (1998)

Volume notes
 Hosted by Professor Owl (voiceover only, before first song only)
 Features the return of "The Siamese Cat Song", cut from the 1994 edition of Heigh-Ho

Happy Haunting - Party at Disneyland! (1998)
Mickey and the gang have a spooky halloween party at a haunted house.

Volume notes
 Hosted by the Magic Mirror (Corey Burton)

Sing a Song with Pooh Bear (and Piglet Too!) (1999)

Volume notes
 DVD released in April 2003 as "Sing a Song with Pooh Bear & Piglet Too!", to coincide with the theatrical release of Piglet's Big Movie.
 † Songs seen only in the 2003 edition
 Originally released as Winnie the Pooh: Sing a Song with Pooh Bear, later reissued in the Sing Along Songs series under a new name with new songs. Also released in the UK, but only the original VHS version.
 Featured at the end of the original release from 1999, Gopher hosts "How to Draw", as he shows you how to draw Pooh's face.

Flik's Musical Adventure at Disney's Animal Kingdom (1999)
Flik, Mickey, Minnie, and the rest of the gang spend the day at Disney's Animal Kingdom.

Volume notes
 Hosted by Flik the Ant from Disney/Pixar's A Bug's Life

Winnie the Pooh - Sing a Song with Tigger (2000)

Volume notes
 Bonus Programming - Tiggerrific Tips on How to Make a Scrapbook!
 Hosted by Tigger, who is showing you his scrapbook
 Released in 2000 in promotion of The Tigger Movie
 This video was not released as a Sing Along Songs volume, rather a "Sing a Song With"..., but otherwise conforms to SAS volume standards.
 Opening credits feature a computer animated tour of Christopher Robin's bedroom showing his stuffed toys, also shown in Sing a Song with Pooh Bear
 Also features bonus music videos at the end of the video to promote the Walt Disney Gold Classic Collection titles: "A Girl Worth Fighting For" (Mulan), "Scales and Arpeggios" (The Aristocats), "The Best of Friends" (The Fox and the Hound), "Steady as the Beating Drum" (Pocahontas), and "Higitus Figitus" (The Sword in the Stone)

Volumes: New series (2003–2006)

Brother Bear - On My Way (2003)

Volume notes
 The first volume to feature a new opening sequence, with the theme song sung by Sebastian from The Little Mermaid
 Hosted by Rutt and Tuke
 Also features Karaoke Mode and three Vocabulary Activities
 "On the Open Road" was presented on Honor to Us All and features a Wilhelm Scream

Home on the Range - Little Patch of Heaven (2004)

Volume notes
 Hosted by Maggie the Cow
 Also features Karaoke Mode and three Vocabulary Activities

Disney Princess Sing Along Songs Vol. 1 - Once Upon a Dream (2004)

Volume notes
 "If You Can Dream" appears to be an original song composed exclusively for this Sing Along Songs volume
 Also features dance alongs, but unlike On My Way and Little Patch of Heaven, the dance alongs are bonus features.

Disney Princess Sing Along Songs Vol. 2 - Enchanted Tea Party (2005)

Volume notes
 DVD includes Princess Tea Time game, Dance Along, Karaoke, Random Play
 "Where Dreams Begin" was newly created for this volume.

Disney Princess Sing Along Songs Vol. 3 - Perfectly Princess (2006)

Volume notes
 Includes Karaoke, Princess Pen Pals, Princess Pals DVD-ROM

Notes

References

Disney direct-to-video films
Sing-along
Home video lines